Glenn Young (December 12, 1929 – October 13, 2013) was an American football defensive back in the National Football League who played for the Green Bay Packers. He was born in Woodstock, Illinois. Young played his college football at Purdue University and played four professional games with the Green Bay Packers in 1956.

References

1929 births
2013 deaths
American football defensive backs
Green Bay Packers players
Purdue Boilermakers football players
People from Woodstock, Illinois